Nemertinoides is a genus of worms belonging to the family Nemertodermatidae.

The species of this genus are found in North America, near Antarctica.

Species:

Nemertinoides elongatus 
Nemertinoides glandulosum 
Nemertinoides wolfgangi

References

Acoelomorphs